1938 Academy Awards may refer to:

 10th Academy Awards, the Academy Awards ceremony that took place in 1938
 11th Academy Awards, the 1939 ceremony honoring the best in film for 1938